The 2017 FIVB Women's Club World Championship was the 11th tournament. It was held for the first time at Kobe Green Arena in Kobe, Japan. Eight teams competed in the tournament, including four wild cards.

Vakıfbank İstanbul won their second world title, defeating Rio de Janeiro in the final, 3–0. Zhu Ting was elected the most valuable player.

Qualification

Pools composition

Squads

Venue

Pool standing procedure
 Number of matches won
 Match points
 Sets ratio
 Points ratio
 If the tie continues as per the point ratio between two teams, the priority will be given to the team which won the last match between them. When the tie in points ratio is between three or more teams, a new classification of these teams in the terms of points 1, 2 and 3 will be made taking into consideration only the matches in which they were opposed to each other.
Match won 3–0 or 3–1: 3 match points for the winner, 0 match points for the loser
Match won 3–2: 2 match points for the winner, 1 match point for the loser

Preliminary round

All times are Japan Standard Time (UTC+09:00).

Pool A

        

|}

|}

Pool B

|}

|}

Classification 5th-8th
All times are Japan Standard Time (UTC+09:00).

Classification 5th-8th

|}

7th place

|}

5th place

|}

Final round
All times are Japan Standard Time (UTC+09:00).

Semifinals

|}

3rd place match

|}

Final

|}

Final standing

Awards

Most Valuable Player
 Zhu Ting (Vakıfbank İstanbul)
Best Opposite
 Tijana Bošković (Eczacıbaşı VitrA)
Best Outside Spikers
 Zhu Ting (Vakıfbank İstanbul)
 Gabriela Guimarães (Rexona-Sesc Rio)

Best Middle Blockers
 Maja Poljak (Dinamo Moscow)
 Kübra Akman (Vakıfbank İstanbul)
Best Setter
 Kaname Yamaguchi (NEC Red Rockets)
Best Libero
 Silvija Popović (Voléro Zürich)

See also
 2017 FIVB Volleyball Men's Club World Championship

References

External links
Official website
Formula

FIVB Volleyball Women's Club World Championship
FIVB Women's Club World Championship
International volleyball competitions hosted by Japan
FIVB
Sports competitions in Kobe
May 2017 sports events in Asia